The 2016 Sport Racer Series is an Australian motor racing competition sanctioned by the Confederation of Australian Motorsport for prototype sports cars. The series is made up of three classes, Sport Racer, Formula 1000 and Radical/Supersports.

Team and drivers

Race calendar 
The series is being contested over five rounds, each consisting of three races.

Series standings

References

Sports Racer Series
Australian Prototype Series